Sandeep Kandola (haryana) is an Indian Kabaddi player. He plays for Telugu Titans in Pro Kabaddi League.

He was again bought by Telugu Titans in PKL 8

In PKL 9 he was bought by the Gujarat Fortune Giants and also because of some unknown reasons He is not so successful in PKL

References

Living people
Indian kabaddi players
Kabaddi players from Andhra Pradesh
Year of birth missing (living people)
Place of birth missing (living people)
Pro Kabaddi League players